The Bronze Medallion is the second step towards the lifeguarding certification in Canada. The award is part of the Lifesaving Society's Bronze series of awards. It teaches an understanding of the lifesaving principles embodied in the four components of water rescue education: judgment, knowledge, skill, and fitness. It is the prerequisite for Bronze Cross; Standard First Aid with CPR-C and 16 years of age are the prerequisites for National Lifeguard Service.

History 
Lifesaving Society's Bronze Medallion program began in 1896 as Canada's first lifesaving certification program.

Prerequisites 
The Lifesaving Society requires Bronze Medallion candidates meet the following prerequisites (award may be expired):
 13 years of age, OR
 Bronze Star

References

Canadian awards
Lifesaving